Emre Vural (born 1984 in Ankara) is a Turkish national rower. He started his rowing career at the beginning of his high-school years at Robert College of Istanbul and competed in the lightweight coxless pair category. He got transferred to Galatasaray in 2004. 
He and his teammate Ahmet Yumrukaya became the first world-champions in the history of Turkey when they got first place in the 2004 Under 23 World Championships held in Poznań, Poland. In 2005, he and Ahmet Yumrukaya came back from the Mediterranean Games held in Almeria, Spain, with a bronze medal, again in the lightweight coxless pair category.  Emre Vural studies at Columbia University in the United States. He still rows for Galatasaray in Turkey and also for the Columbia University rowing team. He graduated in 2008 with a B.A diploma in Economics.  He is now employed at IMS Health in the Pricing and Reimbursement consultancy practice, formerly Cambridge Pharma.

References

External links
 

1984 births
Living people
Turkish male rowers
Galatasaray Rowing rowers
Sportspeople from Ankara
Columbia Lions rowers
Robert College alumni
Mediterranean Games bronze medalists for Turkey
Competitors at the 2005 Mediterranean Games
Mediterranean Games medalists in rowing